Khánh Hưng may refer to several places in Vietnam, including:

Khánh Hưng, Cà Mau, a commune of Trần Văn Thời District
Khánh Hưng, Long An, a commune of Vĩnh Hưng District

See also
Khánh Hưng, capital of former Ba Xuyên Province in South Vietnam, now Sóc Trăng city.